Aldo Patriciello (born 27 September 1957 in Venafro) is an Italian politician and member of the European Parliament since 8 May 2006, when he took the place of Lorenzo Cesa, elected MP in the 2006 Italian general election.

Conviction
Convicted to four months for illegal financing but he has never been jailed.

References

External links
 

1957 births
Living people
People from the Province of Isernia
Christian Democracy (Italy) politicians
Italian People's Party (1994) politicians
European Democracy politicians
Union of the Centre (2002) politicians
Forza Italia politicians
The People of Freedom politicians
Forza Italia (2013) politicians
Politicians of Molise
Union of the Centre (2002) MEPs
The People of Freedom MEPs
MEPs for Italy 2009–2014
MEPs for Italy 2004–2009
MEPs for Italy 2014–2019
MEPs for Italy 2019–2024